Moulaert is a surname. It may refer to:

Frank Moulaert (born 1951), professor of Spatial Planning at the Catholic University of Leuven
Georges Moulaert (1875–1958), Belgian colonial administrator
René Moulaert (1901–1965), Belgian art director who worked on designing stage and film sets